Judge Hoyt may refer to:

Austin Hoyt (1915–1976), judge of the United States Tax Court
Kenneth M. Hoyt (born 1948), judge of the United States District Court for the Southern District of Texas

See also
Justice Hoyt (disambiguation)